= Nordovy =

Nordovy Нордовый
- Island
- Location within Caspian Sea
- Coordinates: 44°28′N 46°59′E
- Country: Russian Federation
- Federal subject: Dagestan Republic

Nordovy Island (Russian: Нордовый) is a small, uninhabited island in the Caspian Sea. It is located 15 km north of Mys Bryanskaya Kosa, a cape on the western Caspian coast.

The island lies in a NW/SE orientation. It is long and narrow, with a length of 1.2 km and a width of 0.2 m. It is a refuge for a variety of marine birds, who thrive undisturbed by human presence.

Nordovy Island belongs to the Dagestan Republic, a federal subject of the Russian Federation.
